Schizolaena isaloensis is a tree in the family Sarcolaenaceae. It is endemic to Madagascar. The specific epithet refers to Isalo National Park, near where the species was identified.

Description
The bark is thick and spongy. Its subcoriaceous leaves are elliptic to ovate or obovate in shape and coloured dark green above and pale green below. The inflorescences of one to three axes each bear one or two flowers each with three sepals and five white petals. A light green involucre hides the young fruit. Specimen notes found "young growth or coppicing plants somewhat glabrous; mature plants tomentose".

Distribution and habitat
Schizolaena isaloensis is known only from the south central regions of Ihorombe and Atsimo-Andrefana, specifically within and just beyond the southern limit of Isalo National Park and near the RN7 road. Its habitat is the central region's Tapia woodlands which are often severely degraded; the recorded specimens occurred in open grassland.

Threats
Schizolaena isaloensis has been found in very low numbers – at most 50 mature individuals. The recorded specimens are outside any protected area. Fires have been the main threat, which mature trees can withstand but younger trees cannot.

References

isaloensis
Endemic flora of Madagascar
Trees of Madagascar
Plants described in 2009